The Chattanooga Southern Railway was founded in 1887 and began operations in 1891. The railroad's nickname, The Pigeon Mountain Route, came from several miles of track that ran along the base of Pigeon Mountain. In 1896 the railroad ran into financial trouble and was reorganized as the Chattanooga Southern Railroad. The company operated under that name for about 15 years at which time it was again reorganized and began operating as the Tennessee, Alabama and Georgia Railway.

References

Defunct Alabama railroads
Defunct Tennessee railroads
Predecessors of the Southern Railway (U.S.)
Railway companies established in 1887
Railway companies disestablished in 1895
Defunct Georgia (U.S. state) railroads